Brad Keller may refer to:
 Brad Keller (baseball) (born 1995), American professional baseball player
 Brad Keller (volleyball), (born 1979), American volleyball coach